Riccardo Giordano (born 14 March 1970) is an Italian windsurfer. He competed at the 1992 Summer Olympics, the 2000 Summer Olympics, and the 2004 Summer Olympics.

References

External links
 

1970 births
Living people
Italian male sailors (sport)
Italian windsurfers
Olympic sailors of Italy
Sailors at the 1992 Summer Olympics – Lechner A-390
Sailors at the 2000 Summer Olympics – Mistral One Design
Sailors at the 2004 Summer Olympics – Mistral One Design
Sportspeople from Palermo
Competitors at the 1993 Mediterranean Games
Mediterranean Games silver medalists for Italy
20th-century Italian people
21st-century Italian people